Eryuan is a county in the Dali Bai Autonomous Prefecture located in southern Yunnan Province, China.

Administrative divisions
Er'yuan County has 6 towns and 3 townships. 
6 towns

3 townships
 Niujie
 Liantie
 Xishan

Ethnic groups
There are 208 ethnic Tibetans in Eryuan County, most of whom reside in Zhengjiazhuang 郑家庄, Sanying Town 三营镇 (Dali Ethnic Gazetteer 2009:216). In nearby Dali City, they are found mostly in Tibetan New Village 藏族新村, Xiaohuayuan 小花园, Dali City 大理市.

Climate

References

External links
 Eryuan County Official Website

County-level divisions of Dali Bai Autonomous Prefecture